Lúcia da Silva Teixeira Araújo (born June 17, 1981) is a Brazilian female visually impaired judoka (disability class B2) competing in the −57 kg division. Teixeira took a silver medal in the 2012 Summer Paralympics and 2016 Summer Paralympics. In 2016, she was defeated by Inna Cherniak of Ukraine who took the gold medal. She won one of the bronze medals in the women's 57 kg event at the 2020 Summer Paralympics held in Tokyo, Japan.

Life 
In 2015, she was one of three Paralympic athletes who took part in a popular video that was intended to introduce Brazilians to the paralympics as a spectator sport. The video was shot with hidden cameras, and it records the reactions of spectators as the three paralympians as they enter three gyms as disabled people and they then impress observers with their abilities. The video attracted million of viewers and acquaintances who never recognised her as a silver medalist from London.

References

Living people
1981 births
Brazilian female judoka
Paralympic judoka of Brazil
Visually impaired category Paralympic competitors
Judoka at the 2012 Summer Paralympics
Judoka at the 2016 Summer Paralympics
Judoka at the 2020 Summer Paralympics
Paralympic silver medalists for Brazil
Paralympic bronze medalists for Brazil
Medalists at the 2012 Summer Paralympics
Medalists at the 2016 Summer Paralympics
Medalists at the 2020 Summer Paralympics
Sportspeople from São Paulo
Paralympic medalists in judo
20th-century Brazilian women
21st-century Brazilian women
Brazilian blind people